Anaplasma platys (formerly Ehrlichia platys) is a Gram-negative bacterium.

References

Rickettsiales
Bacteria described in 2001